Traces Vol.2 is the second greatest hits album by the Japanese band the Gazette, released on March 8, 2017 on Sony Japan, in celebration of the band's 15-year career. 
Unlike the previous greatest hits album, Traces Best of 2005-2009, this time the band re-recorded the songs.

Charts 
The album peaked at the 8° position on the Oricon Albums Chart.

Track listing

Personnel 
 Ruki – vocals
 Uruha – lead guitar
 Aoi – rhythm guitar
 Reita – bass
 Kai – drums

References 

The Gazette (band) albums
Japanese-language albums
2017 greatest hits albums